The Aur Island is an island in Mersing District, Johor, Malaysia. Its corals, lagoons and offshore pools make it a tourist attraction. It has for many years also been a frequent stopover point for fishermen.

There is also a smaller island close by, Dayang Island, which is separated from Aur Island by a narrow channel of about  width at the narrowest point. Both islands are home to Singaporean diving companies, divers reach the island by chartered boats from Mersing or Singapore.

Diving
Due to its distance from the mainland of Peninsula Malaysia, Aur Island offers clear water at its dive sites. Marine life commonly seen by divers include manta ray, barracudas, whitetip sharks, rays, napoleon wrasse, jacks, trevally, yellowback fusiliers, turtle, angelfish, titan triggerfish and bumphead parrotfish.

Climate
The Aur Island weather is affected by the monsoon winds that blows from South China Sea and the Straits of Malacca. The northeast monsoon blows the wind from South China Sea from November to March and this is the time when the east coast has heavy rainfall. Sea activities at this time are confined and the main activity at this time is usually the maintenance of boats and fishing related equipment and kite flying.

The west coast of Aur Island is influenced by the southwest monsoon that blows the wind from the Straits of Malacca during the months of May to September. The periods between the monsoons are usually marked by heavy rainfall.

History
The 1804 naval Battle of Pulo Aura between the British and the French took place in the island's vicinity during the Napoleonic Wars.

Geology
The island spreads over an area of 7.2 km2.

See also
 Battle of Pulo Aura

References

External links
 Tourism Malaysia - Aur Island
 Malaysia Travel Guide: Aur Island

Islands of Johor
Mersing District